Phuket Big Buddha, or The Great Buddha of Phuket, is a seated Maravija Buddha statue in Phuket, Thailand. The official name is Phra Phutta Ming Mongkol Eknakiri, shortened to Ming Mongkol Buddha. Sitting atop Nakkerd Hill (also spelt Nagakerd) near Chalong, construction began in 2004. Expansion of the base was ongoing as of 2015. By 2017, 80 percent of the project had been completed. It is the third-tallest statue in Thailand behind only the Great Buddha of Thailand and Luangpho Yai.

It is made of concrete and covered with Burmese white marble. Facing towards Ao Chalong Bay the statue is the main Buddha of the Wat Kitthi Sankaram temple (Wat Kata). The statue was declared the "Buddhist Treasure of Phuket" by Somdet Phra Yanasangwon, the Supreme Patriarch of Thailand, in 2008.

The statue cost 30 million Baht (approx. $950,000 US in February 2019), sourced primarily from donations. It was built legally in a national conserved forest with the approval of Thai Royal Forest Department.

Names 
The statue's official name is Phra Phutta Ming Mongkol Eknakakiri, which means "the Cherished Auspicious Lord Buddha atop Nāga Hill". The name is a blend of native Thai, Sanskrit, and Pali words – the first element Phra Phutta (Sanskrit ) means "Lord Buddha"; the second element Ming Mongkol means "cherished and auspicious"; the third element Eknakagiri (from Sanskrit/Pali ) means "atop Naga Hill".

See also
 Buddharupa
 Emerald Buddha 
 Golden Buddha (Phra Sukhothai Traimit)
 Iconography of Gautama Buddha in Laos and Thailand
 Other tallest statues in Thailand:
 Great Buddha of Thailand, the tallest
 Luangpho Yai, the 2nd-tallest
 Luang Pho To Wat Intaravihara, the 4th-tallest

References

External links

Outdoor sculptures in Thailand
Colossal Buddha statues
Buildings and structures in Phuket province
Buddha statues in Thailand